Stanton Vincent Durant (b 1942) was Archdeacon of Liverpool from 1991 until 1993.

Durant was ordained in 1973. He was at Emmanuel, Paddington, first as Curate then as Vicar from 1976 to 1987. He then served further incumbencies at  Hackney Marsh and  Stoneycroft before his appointment as Archdeacon.

1942 births
Archdeacons of Liverpool
Living people